The second season (2020–2021) of the Turkish TV series Kuruluş: Osman, created by Mehmet Bozdağ succeeds the first season of the series. Season two of Kuruluş: Osman is also the seventh season of the two Turkish TV series when including the seasons of Diriliş: Ertuğrul and the second season of the historical drama television series. It premiered on 7 October 2020 and finished on 23 June 2021.

Plot 
Aya Nikola is sent by the Byzantine Emperor, Andronikos II to become the new Tekfur of İnegöl followed by Ertuğrul's return in the tribe. Meanwhile, Yavlak Arslan, the new Uç Bey, seeks to create his own state and sees Osman as an obstacle, later on they unite against the new threat created by the new Ilkhan of the Ilkhanate, who allies with Nikola against the Turks of Anatolia. Bala also faces the arrival of Targun, Nikola's spy who allies with Osman to save her father, İnal Bey. Along with these problems, Osman is elected as the new Bey after his father's death, whilst he decides to marry a second wife according to his father's will. After Targun's death, Osman meets Malhun Hatun and initiates a major battle with the Byzantines, historically known as the Battle of Mount Armenia, as well as trying to find the traitor in the Kayı, as his jealous uncle Dündar helps the Byzantines stir traps for him. Dündar is eventually executed by Osman for his betrayal. Following the arrival of Ömer Bey, father of Malhun Hatun, Geyhatu sends Kara Şaman Togay, son of Baycu Noyan, to eliminate both Osman's Kayı and Ömer's Bayındır, but after a series of conflicts between the two tribes, Togay fails and is killed by Osman. Nikola is later defeated by Osman, with the support of Seljuk Sultan Mesud II, though he survives. Osman later marries Malhun Hatun in a political marriage, who eventually gives birth to Osman's first son Orhan, whilst his first wife bala becomes pregnant.

Production
The season was written and produced by Mehmet Bozdağ and directed by Metin Günay. It was filmed in a plateau set in Riva, Beykoz.

Castings 
Mehmet Bozdağ has said there will be a surprise about the character of Ertuğrul Gazi in Kuruluş: Osman while Engin Altan Düzyatan, who plays Ertuğrul in Diriliş: Ertuğrul ghazi, has also said that he may give a surprise in the series but "no clear decision can be made". Ertuğrul was at first thought to appear in season 1, then when he didn't appear, he was still thought to be played by Engin Altan but appear in season 2. Some other rumours indicated that Ediz Hun will play his role. The character's appearance was confirmed at this point. Then when the first trailer was released, it was confirmed that Tamer Yiğit would be playing the role of Ertuğrul. 

Before the release of season 2, Özge Yağız and Yağmur Öztürk were believed to play the role of Malhun Hatun, one of the historical wives of Osman Gazi, due to the fact that they both shared videos of them taking fencing lessons. This thought was dropped after Özge Yağız took part in the TV series  and Yağmur Öztürk took part in the TV series . Yağmur Öztürk was still, however, rumoured to play the role at some point. The 43rd episode trailer then revealed that  was likely to play this role, however, it turned out that she would play the role of "Aksu Hatun". It was later confirmed that Yıldız Çağrı Atiksoy would be playing the role.

Music
The theme music is by Zeynep Alasya. Alpay Göktekin, who composed the theme music for the previous season, died on 5 May 2020, so therefore, could only compose the music for season one of the series.

Reception
Mehmet Bozdağ claims that the show has also been a great success in Albania, he said that the show is the "most watched TV show" in the country. In Albania, the show is called "Osmani". Pakistani media also commented on the season's success, Bol headlined their article as 'First Episode Breaks All Records'.

In 2020, Pakistan's Federal Minister for Science and Technology Fawad Chaudhry, met Burak Özçivit when he visited the Kuruluş: Osman set with his family. It is unknown when he met the Turkish actor but it's likely that it was after Osman became the Kayı Bey due to Burak's outfit. The set was also visited by Pakistani actor Imran Abbas the following year.
	
The conversation between Bamsı Bey and Cerkutay revolving around Prophet Muhammad in the 42nd episode of the series was also the centre of the conversation on social media at the time, it was declared "heart-touching" by fans.

Cast

Main characters 

 Burak Özçivit as Osman Bey
 Özge Törer as Bala Hatun
  as Boran Alp
 Burak Çelik as Göktug Alp
 Ragıp Savaş as Dündar Bey 
 Erkan Avcı as Aya Nikola
 Kanbolat Görkem Arslan as Savcı Bey
 Yıldız Çağrı Atiksoy as Malhun Hatun

Supporting characters 

 Tamer Yiğit as Ertuğrul Bey
 Didem Balçın as Selcan Hatun
  as Petrus
 Seray Kaya as Lena Hatun
 Yağızkan Dikmen as Bayhoca
 Seçkin Özdemir as Komutan Flatyos
 Nurettin Sönmez as Bamsı Beyrek
 Celal Al as  Abdurrahman Gazi
  as Yavlak Arslan
  as Gündüz Bey 
 Çağrı Şensoy as Cerkutay
 Seda Yıldız as Şeyh Edebali 
 Buse Arslan as Aygül Hatun 
 Yeşim Ceren Bozoğlu as Hazal Hatun
 Zeynep Tuğçe Bayat as Targun Hatun
 Emel Dede as Gonca Hatun
 Maruf Otajonov as Geyhatu
 Şahin Ergüney as Ömer/Umur Bey
 Teoman Kumbaracıbaşı as Kara Şaman Togay
  as Epharistos Kalanoz

Minor characters 

 Tolga Akkaya as Dumrul Alp
 Ömer Ağan as Saltuk Alp
  as Kumral Abdal
  as Demirci Davud
 Açelya Özcan as Ayşe Hatun
  as David (disguised as İdris Bey)
 Zabit Samedov as Gence Bey
 Cüneyt Arkın as the head of the White-Bearded Men
 Oğuz Kara as Ahmet Alp
 Ayşen Gürler as Helen
  as Ayaz Alp
 Tekin Temel as Simon (disguised as Melik)
 Fatih Ayhan as Baysungur Alp
 Çağlar Yalçınkaya as Sartaç Alp
 Ahmet Kılıç as Zülfikar Derviş
 Sezanur Sözer as Eftalya
 Kahraman Sivri as Arito Üsta
  as Akça Derviş
 Ahmet Kaynak as Bahadır Bey
 Gözel Rovshanova as Alaca Hatun
 Hazal Benli as Zoya Hatun
 Emre Koc as Komutan Camuha

Guest characters 
 Ümit Belen as Andronikos II Palaiologos
 Murat Ercanlı as İnal Bey
  as Tekfur Aris 
 Uğur Biçer as Komutan Böke
  as Aksu Hatun
 Ekrem İspir as Möngke Han
 Gökmen Bayraktar as Kuzgun Bey
 Alper Düzen as Hasan Bey (appears in episode 41 as tribe Bey)
 Atilla Emirhan Kirik as Ali Bey (son of Hasan Bey)
  as Tekfur Alexis
  as Komutan Alexander

Episodes

Future 
Season 3 released on 7 October.  Filming is occurring in Riva, Beykoz.

Notes

References

External links
Kuruluş: Osman- Season 2 on IMDb

Diriliş: Ertuğrul and Kuruluş: Osman
2020 television seasons